Xavier Cannefax (born 22 September 1989) is an American basketball player for Al Ahli Tripoli.

Career
In the 2019–20 season, Cannefax played for Apollo Amsterdam in the Dutch Basketball League (DBL).  The season was ended early due to the COVID-19 pandemic. He averaged 20.2 points per game in 19 games, which made him the leading scorer of the DBL.

On November 9, 2020, Cannefax signed with Ponte Prizreni in Kosovo.

On February 26, 2023, Cannefax was announced by Al Ahli Tripoli of the Libyan Division 1.

References

External links
Warner Pacific Knights bio

1989 births
Living people
American expatriate basketball people in the Netherlands
American expatriate basketball people in Qatar
American expatriate basketball people in Sweden
American men's basketball players
Apollo Amsterdam players
Basketball players from Oregon
Dutch Basketball League players
Point guards
South Salem High School alumni
Sportspeople from Salem, Oregon
Uppsala Basket players
Warner Pacific Knights men's basketball players

Al Ahli SC Tripoli basketball players